The Windmill is a pub and live music venue in Brixton, London, England, with a reputation for championing new music. It was voted the third best music venue in London, in a 2012 poll in Time Out magazine, and #7 by The Guardian in 2008, and has been described as "one of the top-10 music venues in the U.K.".

History

The pub was built in 1971 for the adjacent Blenheim Gardens housing estate and named after the neighbouring heritage site of the only lasting (and working) windmill (aka Ashby's Mill) in the London area.  It went through various phases of being a bar that attracted locals, bikers, the Irish community and by the end of the 1990s it was hosting DJs, poets and the occasional live bands. Around 2002 the Windmill shifted focus onto live music. Early gigs included a semi-secret double bill of Calexico and Kurt Wagner (of Lambchop) followed by a gig by The 5.6.7.8's, just after they had appeared as the house band in Quentin Tarantino's Kill Bill: Volume 2. A Rottweiler dog living on the roof of the venue (known as "Roof Dog") became the Windmill's mascot, until its death in August 2015.

Bands to have played gigs at The Windmill include: …And You Will Know Us By The Trail Of Dead, Bloc Party, Caitlin Rose, The Crimea, Damo Suzuki, Guillemots, Hot Chip, Los Campesinos, Scritti Politti, Sorry, Stereolab, and The Vaccines. In recent years, the venue has been connected with a resurgence of the South London guitar rock scene, due to frequent shows there by bands such as Black Country, New Road, Black Midi and Squid.

References

External links 
Brixton Windmill website
Frommer's England 2011

Music venues in London
Brixton